Macon Airport can refer to:
 Macon Downtown Airport
 Middle Georgia Regional Airport